Bouillac is the name of several communes in France:

 Bouillac, Aveyron, in the Aveyron département
 Bouillac, Dordogne, in the Dordogne département
 Bouillac, Tarn-et-Garonne, in the Tarn-et-Garonne département